Lao National Radio (officially abbreviated as LNR) is the national radio station for the country of Laos.  It was founded on 13 August 1960 and became a national broadcaster in 1975.

Between 1983 and 1993, Lao National Radio was administered jointly with Lao National Television.

Frequencies
Lao National Radio could be heard on the following frequencies:
 567 kHz AM (Lao National Radio Program 1)
 103.7 MHz FM (Lao National Radio Program 1)

Station

See also
 Lao News Agency
 Vientiane Times
 List of radio stations in Asia

References

References
 Official website

Radio stations in Laos
Multilingual broadcasters
Radio stations established in 1960
1960 establishments in Laos